Payung dance (Minangkabau: tari Payuang;) is a folk dance-drama tradition of the Minangkabau-Malay ethnic group in Sumatra, Indonesia. This dance is a Minangkabau version of other Malay dances from Sumatra. Folk theatre such as toneel and sandiwara often incorporate payung dance as part of the show. The payung (umbrella) is the main prop used in this dance. The payung dance symbolizes affection and the relationship of young people and is usually performed by three or four dancers. The dance originates from Western Sumatra, Indonesia.

Payung dance is performed as a part of toneel, sandiwara, exhibition, opening of party, or wedding occasion of Minangkabau people.

Etymology
In the Indonesian language, payung (Indonesian) or payuang (Minangkabau) means "umbrella" or "parasol". The dance-drama is called payung dance because it uses the umbrella as the main prop to represent security and protection in a marital relationship.

Philosophy
Payung dance uses payung (umbrella) and selendang (shawl) as props. The payung is used by men and the selendang is used by women in the dance. The payung symbolizes protection which for men is generally considered the main function in the family. The male dancer protects the female dancer's head. The selendang used by female dancers symbolizes the sacred bond of love between a couple. The shawl also symbolizes a woman's loyalty and readiness to foster a household with a husband. This idea is performed when the selendang of the female dancer is placed on the male dancer.

Similar dances
Payung dance is also performed by Peranakan communities of Malaysia. Payung dance originated in China and was brought to Malaysia by Chinese diaspora living in the country. This dance evolved with local elements to form a popular type of Peranakan dance.

See also

 Dance in Indonesia
 Lilin dance
 Pasambahan dance
 Piring dance
 Randai

References

Malay dances
Malay culture
Malaysian culture
Minangkabau dance
Theatre in Indonesia
Traditional drama and theatre of Indonesia